Brandywine Township is one of nine townships in Hancock County, Indiana, United States. As of the 2010 census, its population was 2,392 and it contained 892 housing units.

History
Brandywine Township was organized in 1828. It was named from the Brandywine Creek.

Geography
The streams of Maxwell Ditch and Wilson Ditch run through this township.

Cities and towns
 Greenfield (south edge)

Unincorporated towns
 Carrollton
 Reedville Station
(This list is based on USGS data and may include former settlements.)

Adjacent townships
 Center Township (north)
 Blue River Township (east)
 Hanover Township, Shelby County (southeast)
 Van Buren Township, Shelby County (south)
 Sugar Creek Township (west)

Cemeteries
The township contains one cemetery, Little Sugar Creek.

Major highways
  U.S. Route 52
  Indiana State Road 9

Airports and landing strips
 Osgood Field

References
 
 United States Census Bureau cartographic boundary files

External links
 Indiana Township Association
 United Township Association of Indiana

Townships in Hancock County, Indiana
Townships in Indiana